CJWT-FM is a First Nations community radio station that operates at 106.7 FM in Timmins, Ontario.

Owned by the Wawatay Native Communications Society, the station was given approval by the Canadian Radio-television and Telecommunications Commission in 2006.

On March 4, 2016, the CRTC approved Wawatay's application for a broadcasting licence to operate a low-power Type B Native FM radio station in Timmins, Ontario. The station will operate at 106.7 MHz (channel 294LP) with an effective radiated power of 50 watts (non-directional antenna with an effective height above average terrain of 20 metres).

References

External links
www.wawataynews.ca
Wawatay - Archived site from 2007
 

 (Moosonee)

Jwt
Jwt
Radio stations established in 2006
2006 establishments in Ontario